Dream Factory is an unreleased double LP project by Prince and the Revolution.

History
Prince's band, the Revolution, were invited to the studio in 1986 to contribute to a majority of the material for the planned album, with the notable exceptions of "The Ballad of Dorothy Parker" and "Starfish & Coffee" (co-written by Susannah Melvoin). Some tracks included a few band members, most tracks none, some were full band recordings or included other musicians such as Sheila E.  But in September 1986 at the end of the Parade Tour, Prince was too frustrated with the Revolution. The band was dissolved in October 1986, after which many of the album's tracks were incorporated into what was now a planned solo three LP project entitled Crystal Ball.  However, Prince's record distributor at the time, Warner Bros., balked at a three-LP release, so the project was reduced to a two-LP set and retitled Sign o' the Times. Mavis Staples would later cover "Train" for her 1989 album Time Waits for No One; Prince's version would not be released until 2020.

In March 2009, Vibe magazine featured the album on its "51 Albums That Never Were," calling it a "coulda-been classic," and even streaming "All My Dreams" for a limited time. Vibe also interviewed former Revolution members Wendy and Lisa on the project.

Even though the album was never officially released, there is a bootleg CD available of the July 1986 track configuration, which comes with a color pencil sketch made by Susannah Melvoin as cover, which was a concept for the prospective sleeve. This album cover is attributed to The Flesh rather than Prince and the Revolution.

A Super Deluxe Edition of Sign o' the Times was released on September 25, 2020, which included outtakes from the Dream Factory/Camille/Crystal Ball sessions as bonus tracks.

Track configurations

References

Prince (musician) albums
Albums produced by Prince (musician)
Warner Records albums
Unreleased albums